Simon and Garfunkel's Greatest Hits is the first compilation album from Simon & Garfunkel, which was released on June 14, 1972, two years after Simon & Garfunkel had parted ways.

The album is currently available on CD under Legacy's Playlist banner.

Overview

The album was a mix of original studio recordings and four previously unreleased live recordings. The album's minimalist packaging does not specifically date the latter; however, the live versions of "For Emily, Whenever I May Find Her" and "Kathy's Song" included on Greatest Hits were also included on the 2008 album Live 1969. The liner notes to Live 1969 state that these two songs were both recorded at a November 1969 concert in St. Louis, Missouri. According to the liner notes from Collected Works, however, the version of "Kathy's Song" was taken from a 1968 concert in Vermont.

In a 1975 BBC Radio 1 interview, Roy Halee identified this version of "The 59th Street Bridge Song" as being from Simon & Garfunkel's 1970 performance at Carnegie Hall, "the last concert they did together" (prior to their disbanding later in 1970). A live version of "Homeward Bound" was also included on the album.

The remaining ten studio songs comprise nine singles released between 1965 and 1972, "America" being issued as a single several years after its appearance as a track on the Bookends album, and one album track, "Bookends" (without its parent song "Old Friends").

All the singles included, except "America," "El Condor Pasa (If I Could)," and "Scarborough Fair/Canticle" made the Top Ten, with the last peaking at No. 11.  "Mrs. Robinson" topped the chart aided by its appearance in Mike Nichols' hit movie The Graduate. "The Sound of Silence" and "Bridge over Troubled Water" also peaked at No. 1 as singles in their studio versions, and "The Boxer" peaked as a single at No. 7.

Reception

Simon and Garfunkel's Greatest Hits peaked on the U.S. albums chart at No. 5. On the UK Album Chart, it was a No. 2 hit. The album has proven a long and durable seller, currently being certified for 14 million units sold in the U.S. alone. It is easily their best-selling album in the U.S., and holds the record in the U.S. for the best-selling album by a duo.

In 2003, the album was ranked No. 293 on Rolling Stone magazine's list of the 500 greatest albums of all time.

Track listing
All songs composed by Paul Simon unless otherwise noted.

Side one
 "Mrs. Robinson" (some pressings use the single mix with an early fade-out at 3:51; later pressings revert to the Bookends album version at 4:02) – 3:51 or 4:02
 "For Emily, Whenever I May Find Her" (Live) – 2:25
 "The Boxer" – 5:11
 "The 59th Street Bridge Song (Feelin' Groovy)" (Live with applause cross-fade into the studio version of "The Sound of Silence") – 1:50
 "The Sound of Silence" (Acoustic version with electric overdubs) – 3:11
 "I Am a Rock" – 2:53
 "Scarborough Fair/Canticle" (Traditional; arranged by Simon, Art Garfunkel) – 3:09

Side two
 "Homeward Bound" (Live with applause cross-fade into the studio version of "Bridge over Troubled Water") – 2:42
 "Bridge over Troubled Water" – 4:53
 "America" – 3:33
 "Kathy's Song" (Live) – 3:23
 "El Condor Pasa (If I Could)" (Daniel Alomía Robles; English lyrics by Simon, arranged by Jorge Milchberg) – 3:08
 "Bookends" (same track as "Bookends Theme" from the Bookends LP; although cross-faded from "Old Friends" on Bookends, on this album it is a stand-alone track) – 1:21
 "Cecilia" (some pressings use the single mix from 1970; reissues use a hybrid of the single and the album version from Bridge over Troubled Water) – 2:53

Charts

Peak positions

Year-end charts

Certifications and sales

See also
 List of best-selling albums in the United States
 List of diamond albums in France

References

1972 greatest hits albums
Columbia Records compilation albums
Simon & Garfunkel compilation albums
Albums produced by Roy Halee
Albums produced by Paul Simon
Albums produced by Art Garfunkel
Albums produced by Tom Wilson (record producer)
Albums produced by Bob Johnston